WeatherStar (sometimes rendered Weather Star or WeatherSTAR; "STAR" being an acronym for Satellite Transponder Addressable Receiver) is the technology used by American cable and satellite television network The Weather Channel (TWC) to generate its local forecast segments—branded as Local on the 8s (LOT8s) since 2002 and previously from 1996 to 1998—on cable and IPTV systems nationwide. The hardware takes the form of a computerized unit installed at a cable system's headend. It receives, generates, and inserts local forecast and other weather information, including weather advisories and warnings, into TWC's national programming.

Overview
The primary purpose of WeatherStar units is to disseminate weather information for local forecast segments on The Weather Channel. The forecast and observation data – which is compiled from local offices of the National Weather Service (NWS), the Storm Prediction Center (SPC), and The Weather Channel (which began producing in-house forecasts in 2002, replacing the NWS-sourced zone forecasts that were utilized for the STAR's descriptive, regional and extended forecast products) – is received from the vertical blanking interval of the TWC video feed and from data transmitted via satellite; the localized data is then sent to the unit that inserts the data and accompanying programmed graphics over the TWC feed. The WeatherStar systems are typically programmed to cue the local forecast segments and Lower Display Line (LDL) at given times. The units are programmed to feature customized segments known as "flavors," pre-determined segment lengths for each local forecast segment, varying by the time of broadcast, accommodating the inclusion or exclusion of certain products from a segment's product list. (Until the Local on the 8s segments adopted a uniform length, the extended forecast was the only product regularly included in each flavor.) Flavor lengths previously varied commonly between 30 seconds and two minutes, with some running as long as six minutes during the late 1980s and the mid-1990s; in April 2013, the LOT8s segment flavor switched permanently to a uniform one-minute length.

Outside of the regularly scheduled full-screen graphical segments, weather data is also inserted over the channel's national feed via the Lower Display Line; the LDL was originally displayed as a text-only overlay over the bottom third of the video feed on older STAR units up to the Weather Star Jr. model, containing no graphical background and only showing current weather observations and monthly precipitation totals for the chosen reporting station. (The text-based LDL was discontinued on active pre-1998 STAR units on March 11, 2010, coinciding with The Weather Channel permanently adding a version of the LDL for the network's national clean feed.) With the release of the Weather Star XL, the LDL was modified to include short-term daypart (and, later three-day) forecasts for the STAR's home location as well as a semi-translucent background; the later release of the IntelliStar saw the incorporation of additional products into the LDL, including air quality indexes, travel forecasts for three major cities in the region, traffic information and almanac data. The IntelliStar units' LDL was redesigned on November 12, 2013, expanding it to be displayed throughout all programming on the national feed (including commercial breaks and telecasts of its long-form programs, but not during local ad breaks inserted at the provider level); the LDL was replaced by a rundown/progress bar during the full-screen LOT8s segments, indicating the time remaining for the product currently playing and up to two forecast products scheduled to be played afterwards. A sidebar, which was shown only during the channel's forecast programming and was removed during commercial breaks, was also added and paired with the LDL on the right third of the screen over the channel's high definition simulcast feed and displayed supplementary observation data (including visibility, dew point and barometric pressure data that was previously shown on the LDL), average flight delay times for area airports, air quality forecasts, and historical almanac data.

All STAR systems are able to display watches, warnings and advisories issued by the National Weather Service and the Storm Prediction Center for the immediate area where the WeatherStar system's headend is based, which generate a tone as an audible leader to the alert message. Older STAR units up to the WeatherStar 4000 displayed NWS bulletins in the form of a full-screen vertical scroll with differing colored backgrounds (brown for advisories and red for warnings), which was paired with the Lower Display Line. However, the 4000 introduced a horizontal ticker that was restricted to the bottom third of the TWC video feed; since November 12, 2013, IntelliStar models now display alerts over the national feed's headlines ticker placed above the LDL. The systems are also capable of generating multiple scrolling text advertisements that appear at the bottom of the screen during local forecast segments, which are programmed into the administrative menus by a local provider-employed technician. STAR units are also capable of generating advertising tags for overlay on national advertisements seen on the national feed, displaying localized addresses for retailers, and on newer models, tagging products seen during breaks (such as pollen reports).

The Weather Channel provides its STAR units to cable and IPTV providers free of charge. Programming and maintenance of all units is handled by engineers employed by each provider, who are able to modify specifications to generate locally specific weather data, program locally specific greetings for LOT8s segment introductions, generate test alerts viewable only by cable company technicians performing silent remote administration tests, and make upgrades and repairs to the unit's software and hardware. Although extremely rare, the programmability of STAR units at the headend level can leave systems vulnerable to possible tampering. One such instance occurred over Mediacom’s Des Moines, Iowa system on July 21, 2022, when the introductory message to a LOT8s segment displayed a racial slur that was tacked onto a default greeting used to open the segment (one of several programmed into all IntelliStar units that are usually modified only to reference the municipality of the STAR unit), reading "Hello Des Moines, This is your weather my Niggers." TWC parent Allen Media Group (owned and overseen by Black media entrepreneur Byron Allen, and which acquired TWC from a consortium of NBCUniversal, Blackstone and Bain Capital in 2018) stated it would investigate the source of the message, which originated within Mediacom's local headend operations. (A partially censored screenshot of the message was posted on Twitter by a local journalist and circulated on the platform.)

History
Since its introduction at TWC's launch in May 1982, several generations of the WeatherStar have been used. , two STAR models (the IntelliStar 2 and IntelliStar 2 Jr.) are currently being used by cable and IPTV providers for generation of local weather information on the channel.

Weather Star I
The original WeatherStar system, the Weather Star I, was released upon The Weather Channel's launch. Like subsequent WeatherStar units, it received local weather data from TWC and the National Weather Service, via data encoded in the vertical blanking interval of TWC's video feed, as well as receiving extra data from a subcarrier transmitted above TWC's video and audio signals on its transponder on satellite. The Weather Star I was manufactured and developed for TWC by Salt Lake City, Utah-based Compuvid. A couple of years before TWC was founded, Compuvid had already made a similar product which was installed at the headends of cable television systems owned by TeleCable Corporation, a subsidiary of Landmark Communications, TWC's corporate parent at the time and the channel's founding owner. This system displayed weather conditions, forecasts and announcements via a set of weather sensors locally installed at the cable headend. The Weather Star I was an updated version of this unit, receiving data from both The Weather Channel and the National Weather Service.

The Weather Star I, like its two subsequent successors, lacked the ability to generate graphics and was only capable of displaying white text on various backgrounds: purple for the "Latest Observations" (which displayed current weather conditions for the nearest reporting station and others within a  radius of the headend location) and "Weather Information" (which displayed random data, usually weather-related trivia, past weather events in the area, or information on upcoming programming) pages, grey for the "36 Hour Forecast" page (a descriptive forecast using the National Weather Service's zone forecast products), brown for scrolling weather advisories, and red for scrolling weather warnings. Until the release of the Weather Star III, The Weather Channel used a single one-minute local forecast sequence featuring each of the three above-mentioned forecast screens. As with all future WeatherStar models, the Weather Star I could key its text over TWC's national video feed, most often to display the current conditions at the bottom of the screen.

Even though the Weather Star I met the Federal Communications Commission's Part 15 regulations for emanated RF interference (RFI), it still radiated enough to interfere with VHF channel 2 on the broadcast band, resulting in problems at the cable television system's headend where the Weather Star I unit was installed. This problem was temporarily solved by having ferrite chokes attached to all cables and wires attached to the Weather Star. The Weather Star I was also notorious for frequent text jamming and text garbling issues.

Weather Star II
The Weather Star II was released in 1984; the unit had improved RF shielding to reduce interference issues and had an improved overall hardware design. Otherwise, the unit was similar in its features to the Weather Star I.

Weather Star III

The Weather Star III, released in 1986 as an upgrade to the Weather Star II, was another text-only unit that was essentially identical to the two prior WeatherStar models, though with additional internal improvements and forecast products (and consequently, more local forecast sequences). However, TWC decided to drop one of the products included in the unit, "Weather Information," soon after the introduction of the STAR III.

In 2001, the FCC granted The Weather Channel a waiver from complying with its forthcoming requirement for aural tones to accompany broadcast of "scrolled" or "crawled" emergency information, which otherwise went into effect in 2002, for the Weather Star Jr. and Weather Star III. The Weather Star III was capable of generating an aural tone only during the first display of a weather warning, not every time it was shown, as required by the regulations. The waiver, which expired on December 31, 2004, was granted with the understanding that TWC would "replace the Star IIIs in 2003/2004". TWC released an "Audio Weather Alert Enhancement" for the Weather Star Jr. and Weather Star III in June 2004, so that they would emit "a series of audible beeps" every time a tornado warning, flash flood warning or severe thunderstorm warning issued by the National Weather Service was transmitted for insertion over the TWC feed.

The Weather Star III was retired completely in December 2004. From 1989 to 1992, The Weather Network and its French language sister network MétéoMedia – the Canadian equivalents of TWC – used the Weather Star III units to display local forecasts, which were displayed over a sky blue background, a colour that TWC's units did not use.

WeatherStar 4000
The Weather Star 4000 was the first WeatherStar model capable of displaying graphics. First developed in 1988, it was introduced in early 1990. It was designed and manufactured by Canadian electronics company Applied Microelectronics Institute (now Amirix). The first Star 4000s were programmed to operate in a text-only mode (displayed over stylized graphical backgrounds), similar to the STAR III, but with two improvements: an improved font was introduced, as was a graphical radar product at the end of the local forecast segment, showing precipitation that was occurring in the viewer's local geographic area. The first version was just a static (current) image. A second version was added in the fall of 1992, and was a loop showing radar data logged during the previous 90 minutes. Within a brief period of time, the Weather Star 4000 began to produce graphically based local forecast segments, including maps for the regional observation and forecast products. Until 1995, the Star 4000 incorporated a narration track provided by Dan Chandler into the software, which introduced forecast products presented in each flavor; the tracks could be programmed to play either on certain products or all that were featured during that particular flavor. A customized version of the Weather Star 4000 was used by The Weather Network until 1997, when it switched to a technically different system to disseminate local weather information, known as PMX. Due to the cost of upgrading to more advanced units including the IntelliStar, the Weather Star 4000 remained in use in some smaller communities as late as 2014, although it was already being gradually phased out in some areas in favor of the more recent models at that time.

WeatherStar Jr.
The Weather Star Jr. was a budget model manufactured by Wegener Communications for cable headends in smaller communities. Released in 1994 following field testing on eight cable systems in various smaller markets, the system was based on Wegener's Series 2450 graphics display platform, and cost US$500 per unit. It featured the same products used by the Star III, but utilized the typeface used by the 4000. The Weather Channel was able to upgrade Weather Star Jr. units to meet the FCC's 2002 deadline to require broadcasts of "scrolled" or "crawled" emergency information to be accompanied by an aural tone for accessibility reasons. When the change in FCC regulations forced the retirement of the Star III, headends using that unit upgraded to the Weather Star Jr. or more advanced units.

WeatherStar XL
In the fall of 1998, the Weather Star XL, the fifth-generation system in the WeatherStar fleet, was introduced. The Star XL, an IRIX-based computer unit manufactured by SGI, had significantly more advanced technical capabilities than the 4000; it incorporated modernized graphics (with Akzidenz-Grotesk as the main typeface) and a new set of weather icons that would be used on the channel for eight years after its launch. Its on-screen appearance was originally based on those used on the channel's program introductions that were introduced shortly beforehand, but were eventually replaced by a graphics set that closely resembled the original graphical design of the WeatherStar's successor, the IntelliStar.

The Star XL was also the first WeatherStar platform to be adapted and modified by The Weather Channel for use on its sister service Weatherscan, a 24-hour local weather channel carried on select cable systems throughout the country (primarily on digital tiers) that launched in 1999; three years later, the Weatherscan XL units would be phased out for use on Weatherscan (and eventually, on TWC in most large and mid-sized markets) and replaced by the newer IntelliStar technology as part of the first trial of the system. The Star XL model has a high manufacturing cost (US$6,500) and weighs . It was also the first STAR system to utilize Vocal Local, a software function that is technologically different from the narration track used in the WeatherStar 4000, which assembles pre-recorded audio tracks to provide narration of the current temperature and sky conditions, descriptive forecasts and introductions to certain forecast products.

The XL, along with the WeatherStar 4000 and WeatherStar Jr. systems, were retired when The Weather Channel discontinued transmission of its analog satellite feed on June 26, 2014.

IntelliStar

In February 2003, TWC released an advanced model, IntelliStar, initially being rolled out for use on Weatherscan; the "domestic" version intended for use on The Weather Channel was subsequently introduced in early to mid-2004 in the top media markets (including Dallas, Los Angeles, Philadelphia and Pittsburgh). Initially, its graphics were essentially the same as those seen on the WeatherStar XL (though it used Interstate, which was used by TWC for its on-air graphics package at the time, as the typeface instead of Akzidenz-Grotesk) until December 2006, when the IntelliStar received its own, even more realistic icon set – which were used on TWC's on-air and online forecast content as well.

The amount of weather products provided by the IntelliStar had dramatically increased with the revamp: with the addition of school-day and outdoor activity forecasts; ultraviolet indexes and other health information; and the introduction of more localized maps for forecasts and radar/satellite imagery. However, most of the products were dropped in April 2013, when the channel uniformally reduced its local forecast segments to one minute (instead of varying between one and two minutes, depending on the segment). Some of the data added was also incorporated into the Lower Display Line, which eventually added a tabbed display for each product. Through a content agreement with Traffic Pulse, traffic information (in the form of accident and construction reports, roadway flow and average travel times for local roadways) was also presented by the IntelliStar in markets in which Traffic Pulse provided traffic data until TWC's agreement with the company expired in 2010.

The IntelliStar was officially discontinued on November 16, 2015, being replaced by the IntelliStar 2 and IntelliStar 2 Jr.

IntelliStar 2
The IntelliStar 2 (also known internally as IntelliStar 2 HD) – is the seventh-generation WeatherStar system and the first to be capable of generating forecast graphics in both widescreen and high-definition (specifically, in the channel's 1080i format). The unit originally did not feature any programmed narration, a Lower Display Line or icon animations. When the system was officially released in July 2010, many of the existing issues that were present with the ALPHA were corrected. The fully released version of the IntelliStar 2 features an animated lower display line, and various products including current weather conditions, weather bulletins, three-hour Doppler radar loops for the region and the metropolitan area, a 12-hour forecast graph, and 24-hour descriptive and seven-day forecast graphics. From its release until November 12, 2013, the IntelliStar 2 used a graphics package that differed from the original IntelliStar (before both systems implemented a uniform graphics package, the IntelliStar used graphics based on TWC's 2005 package while the IntelliStar 2 used graphics based on the channel's 2008 graphics). Vocal Local narration is done by TWC meteorologist/storm tracker Jim Cantore, instead of Allen Jackson, who provided the narration track for the first generation IntelliStar and WeatherStar XL.

The system was gradually rolled out to major U.S. cable providers strictly for use on The Weather Channel's HD simulcast feed, and originally did not replace existing operational STAR units used on The Weather Channel's standard definition feed or Weatherscan; as a result, TWC became one of the few channels which by necessity does not have an "autotune to HD" version for providers that utilize set-top boxes allowing HD tuning to standard definition channel positions.

IntelliStar 2 Jr.
The IntelliStar 2 Jr., a low-cost digital model suitable for smaller cable providers, was developed and released in 2013. Similar to the first-generation IntelliStar, the unit is capable of operating natively for both analog and digital transmission on cable systems. The Star 2 Jr. was later used as a permanent replacement for all analog WeatherStar systems on June 26, 2014 as a result of the discontinuance of the analog-only units.

IntelliStar 2 xD

The IntelliStar 2 xD is a model of the IntelliStar 2 Series that was released in late 2014 and early 2015 as a replacement of the original IntelliStar 2. It letterboxes The Weather Channel HD feed in SD and sends the full HD feed to the HD Channel. It was made as a full replacement of the IntelliStar.

WeatherStar products
 WS Indicates product is featured on all STAR systems.
 3000 Indicates product is featured on WeatherStar 3000.
 4000 Indicates product is featured on WeatherStar 4000 systems.
 XL Indicates product is featured on WeatherStar XL systems.
 IS Indicates product is featured on IntelliStar systems.
 IS2 Indicates product is featured on IntelliStar 2 and IntelliStar 2 Jr. systems.
 Jr Indicates product is featured on  WeatherStar Jr.

Current products

Former products

References

External links

Television technology
The Weather Channel
1982 software
1982 establishments in the United States